The Bismarck-Oberlyzeum was a girls' gymnasium in Königsberg, Germany. It was named after statesman Otto von Bismarck.

History

The Frankenbergsches Lyzeum on Prinzenstraße in Sackheim was led by Hermine Lewitz and Helene von Frankenberg. When the Rauschningsche Schule was converted into a Mittelschule in 1925, its lyzeum classes were transferred to the Frankenbergsches Lyzeum, which was acquired by the city of Königsberg in 1925. It was renamed the Bismark-Lyzeum in 1930.

In 1931 the school was renamed the Bismarck-Oberlyzeum and acquired the closed Arnheim-Lyzeum of Tragheimer Pulverstraße in Tragheim. In the same year it moved to the modernized western wing of the decommissioned Wrangel-Kaserne (barracks) on Wrangelstraße in northern Tragheim. The barracks' eastern wing contained the Herderschule, a Volksschule. 

The Oberlyzeum's directors were Anna Brenneisen and Franz Rutau, while its students included Tamara Ehlert. The school was not rebuilt in Kaliningrad after World War II.

Notes

References

1931 establishments in Germany
1945 disestablishments in Germany
Buildings and structures in Germany destroyed during World War II
Defunct schools in Germany
Education in Königsberg
Educational institutions established in 1931
Educational institutions disestablished in 1945
Girls' schools in Germany
Gymnasiums in Germany